Sault Ste. Marie Transit Services is a local public transportation service serving the city of Sault Ste. Marie, Ontario providing seven major bus routes and two community bus routes serviced by a fleet of 27 buses and 2 minibuses. The Parabus service consists of 11 vehicles.

History

Early years

Sault Ste. Marie transit services since 1888:
1888–1903: Sault Sainte Marie Electric Light and Transit Company
1903–1942: International Transit Company (the last day of streetcar service was 31 October 1942)
1942–1964: Algoma Steel Corporation Transit
1964 to present: Sault Ste. Marie Transit Services operated by the City of Sault Ste. Marie

Recent history

In 2020, the City of Sault Ste. Marie announced that it was planning to relocate the main municipal bus terminal from Dennis Street to Huron Street where the current bus maintenance facility is.

Routes

Current
All routes start and end at the Downtown Transit Terminal located at Queen Street and Dennis Street.

Frequencies 
All regular routes operate every 30 minutes during weekdays until 7 pm. Regular routes operate every hour weekdays after 7 pm and on weekends.

The Central Community Bus operates every hour, Monday-Friday from 6:30 am to 5:30 pm.

The Pointe des Chenes bus operates as a pilot during the summer of 2021 on weekends and holidays from June 26, 2021 until September 5, 2021 (except Canada Day). It operates 3 trips, one in the morning, afternoon, and early evening.

On-Demand Sunday Evening Service 
Starting on 8 September 2019, Sunday evening service (7 pm to 11:30 pm) was switched to be on-demand. This was due to the low demand during this time. Sunday evening service was previously cut, to the disappointment of riders. Riders book a ride through the Sault Ste. Marie On-Demand app developed by Via or by calling transit dispatch. Riders are between existing stops, not curbside.

Terminals

Downtown Terminal (Queen and Dennis Terminal) 
All routes start and end at the Downtown Terminal. This terminal offers an indoor waiting area, washrooms, shop, and driver facilities. The terminal has 6 bays. The terminal is in poor condition and is due to be replaced. There are also ongoing safety concerns, with the terminal staffed by a security guard. The terminal is also not accessible to passengers with disabilities.

Northern Transfer Hub 
The Northern Transfer Hub opened on 3 May 2021. The Hub features a heated waiting shelter and 4 bus bays. The Hub is located on the Sault College campus providing service to the growing student population and area residents. The Hub is served by routes 2, 4, 5, 6A, 6B, 7, Point des Chenes, and the Central Community Bus.

Incidents

Other services
Sault Ste. Marie is also connected to its American neighbour by the International Bridge Bus, which crosses the Sault Ste. Marie International Bridge. The state of Michigan and the twin cities of Sault Ste. Marie provide the majority of the funding, along with Lake Superior State University and Sault College. In addition to serving both downtown areas, the buses serve LSSU on the Michigan side and the Station Mall on the Canadian side.

Gallery

See also

 Public transport in Canada

References

External links
 Sault Ste. Marie Transit Services

Transport in Sault Ste. Marie, Ontario
Transit agencies in Ontario